The 2022 Red Bull MotoGP Rookies Cup was the sixteenth season of the Red Bull MotoGP Rookies Cup and the tenth year contested by the riders on equal KTM 250cc 4-stroke Moto3 bikes, was held over 14 races in seven meetings on the Grand Prix motorcycle racing calendar, beginning at Algarve International Circuit, Portimão on 23 April and ending on 5 November at the Circuit Ricardo Tormo, Valencia. The season was marred by the death of Czech rider Jakub Gurecký, who was expected to compete in 2022, but died in a private training accident riding his own bike in February.

Calendar and results

Entry list

Riders' Championship standings 
Points were awarded to the top fifteen riders, provided the rider finished the race.

References

External links

Red Bull MotoGP Rookies Cup
Red Bull MotoGP Rookies Cup racing seasons